Mohan is a town and a nagar panchayat in Unnao district in the Indian state of Uttar Pradesh.

History 

Some local residentssay that Mohan is derived from Moh meaning devotional love in Hindi and han meaning loss. A story claims that when Rama was going to Vanvas (self imposed exile) for fourteen years, Mohan is the place where he separated from his wife Sita thinking that he may suffer han in Moh due to the worldly love hence continued forward with his journey. Other local residents say the word Mohan was given by the first inhabitants of this place. They migrated from a small city Mahan in the Kerman province of Iran thereby naming the place after their homeland .

During the Mughal and British empires, Mohan flourished as a town known for its literate people. During the days of the Nawabs of Awadh, many residents found employment in the court of the Nawab and earned large fortunes. The town was well known for its Unani Hakims, mimics and actors. Locals affectionately used to call it as Mohan Khitta-e Unan meaning Mohan as a part of Greece, due to a number of well known Hakims (doctors of Unani medicine).

Demographics
As of 2011 Indian Census, Mohan had a total population of 15,071, of which 7,968 were males and 7,103 were females. Population within the age group of 0 to 6 years was 1,884. The total number of literates in Mohan was 8,220, which constituted 54.5% of the population with male literacy of 59.7% and female literacy of 48.8%. The effective literacy rate of 7+ population of Mohan was 62.33%, of which male literacy rate was 67.8% and female literacy rate was 56.1%. The Scheduled Castes and Scheduled Tribes population was 2,340 and 18 respectively. Mohan had 2454 households in 2011.

As of the 2001 Census of India, Mohan had a population of 13,553. Males constitute 54% of the population and females 46%.  Mohan has an average literacy rate of 46%, lower than the national average of 59.5%: male literacy is 51%, and female literacy is 40%.  In Mohan, 17% of the population is under 6 years of age.

Geography 
Mohan, lies on the left bank of the Sai River, about 6 km east of Hasanganj and 38 km north-east of Unnao. Roads lead from this place to Malihabad in Lucknow district on the east, Nawabganj on the south and Bangarmau on the north-west. It has an average elevation of 128 metres (419 feet). In the British period Mohan was part of Lucknow district. After independence it got merged into the Unnao district.

Places of interest

Dargah
Mohan has the Dargah of Qasim located in its heart which is also a spiritual place for the Shia Islam. Every year on the 7th Muharram of Islamic calendar people gather here to pay obeisance to Qasim ibn Hasan of Karbala and organize a procession to the Imaam chowk. This procession witnesses mourners from many sects and religions.

Sayyids of Mohan
Sayyids from Iran initially chose four places to settle in India. These were Hallaur, Baraha, Mohan and Bilgram. Sayyids of Mohan descend from one of the descendants of the Imam Raza, Sayyid Mahmood Neshapuri who migrated to India from Iran and settled in Mohan. One of the branch of Moosavi and Nishapuri Sayyids from Mohan settled at Bijnor, near Lucknow.

Notable people
 Hasrat Mohani, a well known Urdu poet and freedom fighter of Indian independence from British rule

References 

Cities and towns in Unnao district